James McLaren is a Scottish rugby player.

James McLaren may also refer to:

James McLaren (footballer) ( 1883–1896), Scottish footballer (Hibernian, Celtic, Morton, Clyde and Scotland)
Jim McLaren (1897–1975), Scottish footballer

See also

James MacLaren (disambiguation)